There is an unnamed submarine volcano near the island Ibugos in the Philippines.

Location

Physical features
The volcano is a submarine volcano rising to within  of the sea surface,  due west of Dequey Island.

It is one of the active volcanoes in the Philippines.

Eruptions
Submarine eruptions reported in 1773, 1850, and 1854 are likely to have originated from this volcano. There have been no further reports since 1854.

Listings
The Global Volcanism Program lists it as an unnamed historically active volcano. Philippine Institute of Volcanology and Seismology (PHIVOLCS) lists  23 active volcanoes in the Philippines, but has not included this unnamed volcano, or any volcanic activity at this geographical location.

Volcanoes of the Philippines are all part of the Pacific ring of fire.

See also
 List of volcanoes in the Philippines

References

Stratovolcanoes of the Philippines
Subduction volcanoes
Submarine volcanoes
Volcanoes of the Luzon Strait
Mountains of the Philippines
Landforms of Batanes
Former islands from the last glacial maximum